The flag of Galicia appeared for first time in the 19th century, probably based on the colours of the ancient medieval flags of the Kingdom of Galicia. Originally, the flag was probably a blue St Andrew's Cross over a white field – St Andrew is one of the most popular saints in Galicia. The Coat of Arms of Galicia was actually the former flag of the Kingdom of Galicia. The colors blue, white and gold were always related with Galicia. The chalice, with a silver host, and the golden crosses on blue background have been its symbol since medieval times (13th century). For some time it was thought that it was based on the flag of the maritime province of Corunna, but today it is known that the design is earlier.

Origin
During the 19th century, many thousands of Galicians emigrated to the Americas, with A Coruña being the main Galician port from which the emigrants departed. Tradition has it that the Galician emigrants thought that the A Coruña naval flag flying on the emigrant ships was actually the flag of Galicia. Therefore, when they arrived at the new world they started flying the A Coruña naval flag, believing this to be the flag of Galicia. Years later, the flag crossed the Atlantic back to the homeland, where it was officially adopted as the new flag of Galicia.

Design
Originally, the flag for the maritime province of A Coruña was a blue St Andrew's Cross over a white field – St Andrew is one of the most popular saints in Galicia, where 72 parishes are devoted to him. This flag closely resembled the flag of Scotland –  an interesting coincidence considering that, according to legend, the Gaelic peoples of Britain and Ireland originally came from Galicia.

In 1891 the St Andrew's Cross flag had to be modified because it was causing confusion with the flag of the Imperial Russian Navy. Hence, it was decided to drop one of the arms of the cross. The result was the modern Galician flag.

Specification

The law of symbols of Galicia (29 May 1984) regulates the official colours, proportions and uses of the Galician symbols. The symbols of Galicia are the civil flag, which is the blue and white flag, the coat of arms of Galicia, and the flag, which is the result of adding the coat of arms over the civil flag.

The coat of arms of Galicia was actually the former flag of the Kingdom of Galicia prior to the creation of the modern flag in the 19th century. In the early 1980s, the Royal Galician Academy asked the Galician Government to incorporate the former flag of the Kingdom of Galicia onto the modern flag. The result of that suggestion was the State Flag. The State Flag features the Galician coat of arms over the common civil flag, and it is the official flag that must be displayed in all institutional events of the national and local governments in Galicia.

"The flag of Galicia shall have the official Coat of Arms when displayed on public buildings and institutional events in Galicia", Law 5/1984 of Symbols of Galicia, Article 2.2.

Historical flags

Other flags

 Many left-wing Galician nationalists add a five-pointed red star to the Galician flag to show their support of socialism or communism. This flag was adopted as the official logotype of the Bloque Nacionalista Galego (Galician National Party).
 Following the oil spill of the petrol tanker Prestige off the Galician coast in 2002, Galician demonstrators used a Galician flag dyed in black with the phrase Nunca Máis (Never Again). This flag has become a very popular symbol for environmental activism in Galicia.

See also 
Coat of arms of Galicia

References

External links
 The Galician Flag in the Flags of the World's website
 History of the Galician Flag and Flag Flying Days

Galicia, Flag of
Galician symbols
History of Galicia (Spain)
Galicia
Galicia